Marian Zygmunt Kuszewski (31 October 1933 – 5 March 2012) was a Polish fencer. He won a silver medal in the team sabre events at the 1956 and 1960 Summer Olympics.

References

1933 births
2012 deaths
Polish male fencers
Fencers at the 1956 Summer Olympics
Fencers at the 1960 Summer Olympics
Olympic fencers of Poland
Olympic medalists in fencing
Olympic silver medalists for Poland
Medalists at the 1956 Summer Olympics
Medalists at the 1960 Summer Olympics
Sportspeople from Kielce
20th-century Polish people
21st-century Polish people